Mike Baur is a Swiss businessman and entrepreneur. He is the co-founder and managing partner of Swiss Startup Factory. Baur worked in banking for over 20 years, including for UBS and Clariden Leu. He quit to begin investing in startup companies before co-founding Swiss Startup Factory in 2014 with Max Meister and Oliver Walzer. Baur participated as a jury member at the START Summiteer, a start-up pitching contest of the University of St Gallen. In January 2016, Baur was named deputy managing director of CTI Invest when Swiss Startup Factory partnered with CTI. Baur led the Swiss Startup Factory through its accelerator program with Goldback Group in early 2016, as well as its partnership with Fintech Fusion in February 2016. In December 2016, the Wall Street Journal profiled Baur's early career from Swiss banking to entrepreneurship and startup investments.

References

Swiss company founders
Venture capitalists
Living people
Year of birth missing (living people)